Hong Tai-kwai (born 8 December 1946) is a Taiwanese gymnast. She competed at the 1964 Summer Olympics and the 1968 Summer Olympics.

References

1946 births
Living people
Taiwanese female artistic gymnasts
Olympic gymnasts of Taiwan
Gymnasts at the 1964 Summer Olympics
Gymnasts at the 1968 Summer Olympics
People from Pingtung County
20th-century Taiwanese women